Mangbetu may refer to:

Mangbetu people, a people of the Democratic Republic of the Congo
Mangbetu language, one of the most populous of the Central Sudanic languages
 Mangbetu languages, a cluster of closely related languages spoken in the Democratic Republic of Congo